Richard Sacher (1 September 1942 – 27 February 2014) was a Czech politician and civil servant. He was the first post-Communist Interior Minister of Czechoslovakia for a year. He served from 1989 through 1990. He was also a member of the federal assembly for two years. In 2000, Sacher ran for the Senate, but lost the election.

Sacher died on 27 February 2014 in a hospice in Červený Kostelec, Czech Republic, aged 71.

References

1947 births
2014 deaths
Ministers of the Interior of Czechoslovakia
KDU-ČSL politicians
Czechoslovak politicians
Czech politicians
People from Trutnov District
Charles University alumni